The 2016 American Athletic Conference Football Championship Game, held on Saturday, December 3, 2016, was the second football championship game for that conference. Houston defeated Temple, 24–13, in last year's game.

Teams

Navy

The Navy Midshipmen football team is a member of the American Athletic Conference in its West Division. They represented the West Division in the American Athletic Conference Championship Game.

Navy hosted the title game. Since Navy and Temple both finished 7–1 in American play and did not play during the regular season, the next tiebreaker used to determine the home team was College Football Playoff (CFP) ranking. Under American Conference rules, if one or both division champions enter the final week of conference play in the CFP rankings, the higher-ranked team will host, provided that it wins its game that week. Since Navy entered its conference finale against SMU at #25 in the CFP rankings, and won that game 75–31, the Midshipmen earned hosting rights. This was Navy's first ever conference championship appearance.

Temple

The Temple Owls went 7–1 in American Athletic Conference play, finishing 1st in the East Division for the second straight year. Due to their win over South Florida, they represented the East Division in the American Athletic Conference Championship Game. This was their second straight conference championship appearance. They were attempting to earn their first conference title since 1967, when the Owls were in the Middle Atlantic Conference.

Game summary

Source:

Statistics

References

Championship
American Athletic Conference Football Championship Game
Navy Midshipmen football games
Temple Owls football games
American football in Maryland
December 2016 sports events in the United States
2016 in sports in Maryland